The Italian University Line, often abbreviated as IUL, is a private university founded in 2005 in Firenze, Italy. The school provides e-learning courses in centers throughout Italy.

See also
 List of Italian universities
 Distance education

External links
 

Education in Florence
Private universities and colleges in Italy
Educational institutions established in 2005
Buildings and structures in Florence
Distance education institutions based in Italy
2005 establishments in Italy